Marc Miller may refer to:

 Marc Wolfgang Miller, American cryptozoologist
 Marc Miller (game designer) (born 1947), American game designer
 Marc Miller (musician) (born 1955), American musician
 Marc Miller (politician) (born 1971), Canadian politician
 Marc Miller (racing driver) (born 1975), American racecar driver

See also 
 Mark Miller (disambiguation)
 Mac Miller, American rapper and record producer